Schlieren (Zürich German Schlierä) is a municipality in the district of Dietikon in the canton of Zürich in Switzerland.

History 

The oldest artifact discovered in the Canton of Zürich is a Stone Age Neanderthal hand axe which was found in Schlieren, and dates back to approximately 100,000 BCE.

Until 1415, Schlieren belonged to Habsburg. After the conquest of Aargau by the Swiss Confederates it was a component of the county of Baden. In 1803 Schlieren was assigned to the Canton of Zürich. In 1777 the minister Heinrich Keller created here the first "deaf-mute school" in Switzerland. Thanks to the proximity to the city of Zürich and the good traffic facilities (Tram, S-Bahn), Schlieren showed a population growth of 10,000 since the 1930s.

Schlieren was considered for inclusion of the expansion of Zurich's city limits, but was ultimately not part of the expansion of 1934.

Geography
Of this area, 19.5% is used for agricultural purposes, while 28.1% is forested. Of the rest of the land, 50.7% is settled (buildings or roads) and the remainder (1.7%) is non-productive (rivers, glaciers or mountains).  housing and buildings made up 36.6% of the total area, while transportation infrastructure made up the rest (14.1%). Of the total unproductive area, water (streams and lakes) made up 1.8% of the area.  43.5% of the total municipal area was undergoing some type of construction.

Schlieren lies to the south of the river Limmat in the Limmat Valley (German: Limmattal), and west of Zurich. It is part of the Zurich metropolitan area.

Demographics
Schlieren has a population of 13,860, of which 42.5% are foreign nationals.  the gender distribution of the population was 50.6% male and 49.4% female. Over the last 10 years the population has grown at a rate of 10.2%. Most of the population speaks German (71.3%), with Italian being second most common ( 8.5%) and Serbian being third ( 4.4%).

In the 2007 election the most popular party was the SVP which received 40.8% of the vote. The next three most popular parties were the SPS (21.1%), the FDP (10.1%) and the CVP (9.3%).

The age distribution of the population is children and teenagers (0–19 years old) make up 20.1% of the population, while adults (20–64 years old) make up 64.2% and seniors (over 64 years old) make up 15.7%. In Schlieren about 58.8% of the population (between age 25-64) have completed either non-mandatory upper secondary education or additional higher education (either university or a Fachhochschule). There are 6262 households in Schlieren.

Schlieren has an unemployment rate of 4.23%. , there were 62 people employed in the primary economic sector and about 11 businesses involved in this sector. 2796 people are employed in the secondary sector and there are 189 businesses in this sector. 8688 people are employed in the tertiary sector, with 659 businesses in this sector.  39.1% of the working population were employed full-time, and 60.9% were employed part-time.

 there were 5481 Catholics and 2920 Protestants in Schlieren. From the 2000 census, 29.5% were some type of Protestant, with 27.1% belonging to the Swiss Reformed Church and 2.4% belonging to other Protestant churches. 39.5% of the population were Catholic. Of the rest of the population, 10.2% were Muslim, 15.2% belonged to another religion (not listed), 4.7% did not give a religion, and 9.2% were atheist or agnostic.

Government and infrastructure 
Schlieren is home to the Eastern Switzerland Office of the Investigation Bureau for Railway, Funicular and Boat Accidents.

Transportation 

The municipality is served by two railway stations, on different lines of the Zürich S-Bahn. Schlieren railway station is in the geographic centre of the municipality and a stop on lines S3 and S12. Although Urdorf railway station takes its name from the adjoining municipality of Urdorf, it is actually located just within the boundaries of Schlieren, and is a stop on lines S9 and S15.

Between 1900 and 1931, Dietikon was a stop on the Limmattal tramway from Zürich, and from 1931 to 1955 it was the terminus of that line. Until recently, it was the terminus of Zürich trolleybus route 31 that replaced the truncated tramway. The, now under construction, Limmattal light rail line will follow a similar alignment, from Zürich Altstetten railway station to Killwangen, and Zürich tram route 2 will be extended to Schlieren to replace the trolleybus.

Objects of interest 

Former gas facility. Local museum and several city parks. Biggest covered climbing hall in Europe.

Politics 
Since 2019 the town president (mayor) is Markus Bärtschiger of the Social Democratic Party.

Education 
Schools in Schlieren include Schule Hofacker, Schule Grabenstrasse, Schule Schulstrasse, Schule Zelgli, and Schule Kalktarren.

Sports interest 
At 3 October 1909 in Schlieren, the fourth Gordon Bennett Cup in ballooning was held. "Crowds came out to Schlieren. 40 mounted and 260 unmounted patrolmen took care to keep the traffic flowing. The chronicles report about 400 automobiles, counted a total of 142 trains on the railroad and the tramway should have transported 400.000 persons. It was the most busy traffic, Zurich had ever seen till then, and never at an air show in Switzerland, this amount of spectators was reached again."

Notable people 

 Paul Zollinger (born 1944), a Swiss former racing cyclist, the Swiss National Road Race champion in 1966
 Urs Allemann (born 1948), writer and journalist
 Mario Cantaluppi (born 1974), former footballer, 500 club caps and 22 caps for Switzerland
 Diamá (born 1980), aka Claudia D'Addio, is a Swiss singer
 Martin Steuble (born 1988), a Filipino professional footballer, approx. 150 club caps and 39 for the Philippines
 Tanja Schärer (born 1989), a Swiss freestyle skier, specializing in aerials, competed at the 2010 Winter Olympics
 Anto Grgić (born 1996), a Swiss professional footballer currently playing for FC Sion
 Kevin Iodice (born 2001), a Swiss professional footballer currently playing for FC Vaduz

References

External links 

  

 
Cities in Switzerland